Fraser Aird (born 2 February 1995) is a Canadian professional soccer player who plays as a winger for Cavalry FC. Aird has also played for the Canada national team.

Early life
Aird is a boyhood fan of his former club Rangers due to his Scottish, Rangers-supporting parents emigrating to Canada in 1987.

Club career

Rangers
Aird signed as a youth for Rangers at the age of sixteen. Within a year at the club he worked his way from the under-17 squad to the under-19 squad, eventually making his first team debut during a 4–1 victory over Montrose in the Scottish Third Division on 23 September 2012. Aird was incorrectly listed as the goalkeeper by many media sources during a match against Elgin City in December 2012 when it was actually Neil Alexander. He scored his first goal for the club versus Queens Park at Hampden Park on 29 December 2012.

In his first competitive match of the 2013–14 season he scored the first goal for Rangers as a half-time substitute against Forfar Athletic in the League Cup, Rangers went on to lose 2–1. On 3 May 2014, after a 1–1 draw with Dunfermline Athletic, Aird was among the Rangers players who made history by becoming the first Rangers side in 115 years to go an entire league season unbeaten, during which they clinched the Scottish League One Championship.

Vancouver Whitecaps FC (loan spell)
Aird joined Major League Soccer club Vancouver Whitecaps FC on a season-long loan on 29 January 2016. He made his debut against Montreal Impact on 7 March 2016.

Falkirk
On 18 January 2017, Aird signed for Falkirk of the Scottish Championship until the end of the end of the season after mutually "agreeing to terminate his contract with Rangers." He made his debut for Falkirk in a 2–0 defeat to Greenock Morton in the Scottish Cup. His first goal came against Ayr United in a 4–1 win on 11 March 2017. At the end of his contract in May 2017, Aird was released by the club.

Dunfermline Athletic
Aird signed a one-year deal with Dunfermline Athletic on 3 August 2017, with the option of a further year.

Dundee United
On 1 June 2018, Aird signed a two-year contract with Dundee United. On 2 September 2019 he left Dundee United by mutual consent.

Queen of the South (loan spell)
On 31 January 2019, Aird was sent out on loan to Dumfries club Queen of the South until 31 May 2019.

Cove Rangers
On 26 September 2019, Aird signed for Aberdeen club Cove Rangers until January 2020. He left the club shortly before the expiry of his contract after he was pictured gesturing towards opposition fans while supporting Rangers in an Old Firm match.

Valour FC
Aird joined Valour FC of the Canadian Premier League on 24 January 2020. He made his debut for Valour on 16 August in a 2–0 loss to Cavalry FC. Aird scored his first goal for Valour in the following game against Atlético Ottawa, netting a penalty on 19 August.

FC Edmonton
On 24 December 2020, Aird signed with FC Edmonton.

Cavalry FC
On 9 February 2022, Aird signed a two-year contract with an option for 2024 with Cavalry FC. He began the season as a mainstay in Cavalry's midfield, playing every single minute until he suffered a long term ACL injury in his fifth match of the season, against FC Edmonton.

International career
Aird was part of a Canadian under-15 camp in 2010 and played in a friendly against the US the same year. After moving to Scotland, the country of his parents birth, Aird made his debut for Scotland at under-17 level in a friendly international tournament in August 2011. In 2012, he made his debut in a UEFA competition for Scotland featuring in the UEFA Under 17 Championship qualifying campaign against Macedonia. In his final under-17 game, he scored against Denmark.

Aird was named in the preliminary Canada national team squad for the 2013 Gold Cup in the US, however he turned down a call up to the final squad and later in the same year represented Scotland under-19's. Aird played twice for Scotland under-19 in friendlies scoring in 4–2 victory over Switzerland.

In April 2014 it was reported that Aird was set to pledge his international allegiance to Canada and join the senior squad for friendlies against Bulgaria and Moldova in Austria the following month, a claim the player later refuted on his personal Twitter account by saying he was still undecided on his future. In May 2014 Aird joined a training camp in Florida with the Canadian Under-20 team in preparation for the 2015 CONCACAF U-20 Championship, the tournament which will serve as CONCACAF qualification for 2015 FIFA U-20 World Cup.

On 28 September 2015 it was reported on the official Rangers website that Aird had been called up by Canada for an October friendly against Ghana. Aird got his first senior international cap in the match coming on as a second-half substitute for Karl Ouimette in the eventual 1–1 draw on 13 October 2015. Aird scored his first goal for Canada against his ancestral Scotland in a 1–1 draw on 22 March 2017.

Career statistics

Club

International 

Scores and results list Canada's goal tally first, score column indicates score after each Aird goal.

Honours
Rangers
 Scottish Third Division: 2012–13
 Scottish League One: 2013–14

Individual
 Rangers Young Player of the Year: 2013–14

See also
List of sportspeople who competed for more than one nation

References

External links
 
 
 

Living people
1995 births
Association football midfielders
Canadian soccer players
Scottish footballers
Soccer players from Toronto
Canadian people of Scottish descent
Rangers F.C. players
Vancouver Whitecaps FC players
Falkirk F.C. players
Dunfermline Athletic F.C. players
Dundee United F.C. players
Queen of the South F.C. players
Cove Rangers F.C. players
Valour FC players
FC Edmonton players
Cavalry FC players
Scottish Football League players
Scottish Professional Football League players
Major League Soccer players
Canadian Premier League players
Scotland youth international footballers
Canada men's international soccer players
2017 CONCACAF Gold Cup players